is a Japanese manga series written and illustrated by Makoto Kobayashi. It was serialized in Kodansha's seinen manga magazine Weekly Young Magazine from 1985 to 1991, with its chapters collected in 11 tankōbon volumes. A two-episode original video animation (OVA) adaptation was released in 1991. Another manga series created by Kobayashi and Olympic gold medalist judoka, Yuko Emoto, titled JJM: Joshi Judou-bu Monogatari, started in 2016.

Media

Manga
Written and illustrated by Makoto Kobayashi, Judo-bu Monogatari was serialized in Kodansha's seinen manga magazine Weekly Young Magazine from 1985 to 1991. Kodansha collected its chapters in 11 tankōbon volumes, released from June 15, 1987, to August 13, 1991.

A related manga series, titled , with an original story by Yuko Emoto, 1996 Atlanta Olympic Women's Judo-61 kg gold medalist, featuring a female protagonist, started in Kodansha's Evening on August 9, 2016.

Original video animation
A two-episode original video animation (OVA) adaptation by Studio Deen was released on VHS from March 25 to June 25, 1991.

References

External links
  
 

Judo in anime and manga
Kodansha manga
Seinen manga
Studio Deen